Hsekiu, alternatively Seka, is mentioned in the Palermo Stone as a Predynastic Egyptian pharaoh (king) who ruled in Lower Egypt. As there is no other evidence of such a ruler, he may be a mythical king preserved through oral tradition, or may even be completely fictitious.

References

People whose existence is disputed
Pharaohs only mentioned in the Palermo Stone